Events from the year 1840 in Scotland.

Incumbents

Law officers 
 Lord Advocate – Andrew Rutherfurd
 Solicitor General for Scotland – James Ivory; then Thomas Maitland

Judiciary 
 Lord President of the Court of Session and Lord Justice General – Lord Granton
 Lord Justice Clerk – Lord Boyle

Events 
 10 January – Uniform Penny Post introduced throughout the United Kingdom, replacing the Uniform Fourpenny Post of 1839. From 6 May, the Penny Black, the world's first postage stamp, becomes valid for prepayment of postage. Advocates of the scheme include Robert Wallace (MP for Greenock) and James Chalmers.
 14 January – the first known baptisms by the Church of Jesus Christ of Latter-day Saints in Scotland take place in the River Clyde at Bishopton when Samuel Mulliner, a Scot who joined the church in Canada, baptizes Alexander and Jessie Hay. In May, Orson Pratt preaches from Arthur's Seat in Edinburgh.
 July – last known great auk in the British Isles caught and later killed on the islet of Stac an Armin, St Kilda, Scotland.
 4 July – the Cunard Line's 700-ton wooden paddle steamer , launched by Robert Duncan & Company at Greenock on 5 February, departs from Liverpool bound for Halifax, Nova Scotia, on the first steam transatlantic passenger mail service. Scottish marine engineer Robert Napier is  a major partner in the venture and has supplied the ship's engine.
 21 July – first burial at the Southern Necropolis in Glasgow.
 12 August – the Glasgow, Paisley, Kilmarnock and Ayr Railway is opened throughout between Glasgow Bridge Street railway station and Ayr, the first inter-urban railway in Scotland.
 15 August – foundation stone of the Scott Monument in Edinburgh is laid.
 31 August – the Slamannan Railway is opened.
 Approximate date – Forglen House, designed by John Smith, is completed.

Births 
 1 January – Dugald Drummond, steam locomotive engineer (died 1912 in England)
 24 January – George Smith, Bishop of Argyll and the Isles (Catholic) (died 1918)
 5 February
 Charlotte Carmichael, pioneer of higher education for women (died 1929 in England)
 John Boyd Dunlop, inventor (died 1921 in Ireland)
 3 March – Hugh Smellie, steam locomotive engineer (died 1891)
 22 April – Thomas Clouston, psychiatrist (died 1915)
 15 July – William Wilson Hunter, official of the Indian Civil Service (British India) (died 1900 in England)
 29 November – James Crichton-Browne, psychiatrist (died 1938)
 J. M. Brydon, architect (died 1901 in England)

Deaths 
 9 March – George Gleig, Primus of the Scottish Episcopal Church (born 1753)
 10 April – Alexander Nasmyth, painter (born 1758)

See also 

 1840 in the United Kingdom

References 

 
19th century in Scotland
Scotland
1840s in Scotland